A list of notable historians from Uruguay:

A
Carlos Anaya
Mariano Arana
Orestes Araújo
Arturo Ardao
Leopoldo Artucio
Fernando O. Assunção

B
Francisco Bauzá

C
Marta Canessa

G
Juan Giuria

F
Hugo Fernández Artucio

L
Rolando Laguarda Trías
César J. Loustau
Aurelio Lucchini

M
Carlos Maggi
Isidoro de María
Alberto Methol Ferré

N
Benjamín Nahum

R
Carlos Real de Azúa
Silvia Rodríguez Villamil (1939-2003), historian, feminist, writer, activist
Graciela Sapriza (born 1945), Uruguayan historian, educator

S
Oscar Secco Ellauri

Z
Alberto Zum Felde

See also
History of Uruguay

 
Uruguay
Historians